Habenaria halata, commonly known as the sweet rein orchid, is a species of orchid that is endemic to northern parts of the Northern Territory. It has two or three leaves at its base and up to eighteen small white, sweet-smelling flowers with a labellum shaped like a trident.

Description 
Flowering occurs from December to February.

Taxonomy and naming
Habenaria halata was first formally described in 2002 by David Jones from a specimen collected near Darwin and the description was published in The Orchadian. The specific epithet (halata) is Latin word meaning "odor", "fragrance" or "perfume".

Distribution and habitat
The sweet rein grows with low shrubs, sedges and grasses in Melaleuca viridiflora woodland in northern parts of the Northern Territory.

References

Orchids of the Northern Territory
Endemic orchids of Australia
Plants described in 2002
halata